Boudales is an alternative name to several wine grape varieties including:

Canari noir
Cinsaut
Grolleau (grape)